Johnny Johnson III (born May 4, 1999) is an American football wide receiver for the Houston Texans of the National Football League (NFL). He played college football for the Oregon Ducks from 2017 to 2021.

College career
Johnson finished his college career with 139 receptions and 1,928 receiving yards. As a junior, he caught 57 passes for 836 yards and seven touchdowns for the 2019 Oregon Ducks football team that won the Pac-12 Conference championship and defeated Wisconsin in the 2020 Rose Bowl. As a fifth-year senior in 2021, he tallied 25 receptions for 311 yards before an injury sustained against Washington State ended his season.

Career
On April 30, 2022, Johnson signed with the Houston Texans as an undrafted free agent. He signed a reserve/future contract on January 10, 2023.

References

External links
Houston Texans bio
Oregon Ducks bio

1999 births
Living people
American football wide receivers
Oregon Ducks football players
Houston Texans players
People from Chandler, Arizona